First Creek is a stream in Gasconade County in the U.S. state of Missouri. It is a tributary of Gasconade River.

First Creek was named for the fact it is the first in order of tributaries on the Gasconade River from the nearby Missouri River.

See also
List of rivers of Missouri

References

Rivers of Gasconade County, Missouri
Rivers of Missouri